Retro Puppet Master (also known as Retro Puppetmaster) is a 1999 American direct-to-video horror film written by Charles Band, Benjamin Carr and David Schmoeller, and directed by David DeCoteau (as Joseph Tennent). It is the seventh film in the Puppet Master franchise, a prequel to 1991's Toulon's Revenge, and stars Greg Sestero as a young André Toulon, Jack Donner as an Egyptian responsible for teaching Toulon how to animate his puppets, and Stephen Blackehart, Robert Radoveanu and Vitalie Bantas as demons who pursue Toulon for his magic.

While Retro serves to explain how Toulon began practicing the spell which animates his puppets, it ignores what was originally established in the second film as exactly how he learned the spell of animation. The film was also Guy Rolfe's final appearance as Toulon, save for flashback footage in The Legacy.

The comedic film commentary series RiffTrax riffed the film in 2017. A spin-off based on a puppet from the movie is in development and is slated for a 2022 release.

Plot
The film begins in 1944, Switzerland, taking place after the events of Puppet Master III: Toulon's Revenge. Toulon and his little friends are still on the run, and decide to hide in the Kolewige, an inn  from the Swiss border. Blade finds the wooden head of an old puppet named Cyclops in their trunk, and when Toulon sees it, he then tells his puppets the adventures he had with the woman he loves, and his retro puppets, starting in Cairo, Egypt, in 1902.

A 3,000-year-old Egyptian sorcerer, named Afzel, has stolen the secret of life, and is fleeing the servants of an evil Egyptian god, named Sutekh. Two servants, imbued with magical power from Sutekh, attack him, but are killed easily by Afzel and his own magical power. After dispatching the two servants he begins his journey to Paris.

Meanwhile, Sutekh has given life to three of his oldest servants—Egyptian mummies. After they rise from their chamber they too begin to pursue Afzel.  Cut to Paris, where a young André Toulon is putting on a puppet show of Dante's Divine Comedy.  Watching from the crowd is Elsa, who has left her cruel, cold-hearted, abusive, ambassador father and harmless mother to view the wonders of the country and has decided to see the play. In the sewers nearby the three mummies have hired two thugs to kill Afzel.  The thugs are necessary since Afzel has the power to sense the coming of the mummies.

Afzel is beaten brutally until Elsa, leaving the theater, sees them and cries for help. The thugs then scatter, leaving Toulon and Elsa to pick Afzel up and bring him inside. Later, when he stirs from his sleep, he talks with Toulon and reveals that he knows the secret of life, and it's the only thing that can protect humankind when the elder gods rise up in 100-1,000 years, and needs to pass it on to Toulon. Toulon is skeptical until Afzel begins to make the puppets move. Now Toulon realizes he is genuine and begins to learn his powers. Then Afzel starts to make the puppets draw a barrier that's supposed to protect him if the servants come back.

While stepping outside for a brief moment, Toulon begins to talk to a beggar who has sat on the steps since the beginning of the movie.  However, he is dead, and when Andre becomes aware of this he begins to mourn.  Afzel tells him to bring him inside to teach him the true secret of life. After bringing him inside they use a ring to transfer the soul of the beggar to the puppet, "Pinhead". The puppet starts to move but, after a few questions the puppet runs away into the theater. Later on, Elsa returns to talk to Toulon, until her father's rude servants come by, and they take Elsa and Toulon back to her house, and after Toulon talks to the father, he gets knocked out, and is then thrown into the woods.

The next day, back at the theater, Valentin storms in as the barrier written on paper falls off the wall. The three mummies see their chance to attack and begin their rampage through the theater. Valentin finishes repairing the door as two of the mummies break in and kill him. Vigo runs backstage to Duval and Latour and falls dead. Duval stabs the lead mummy in his hand as the mummy kills him with his other hand. Latuor gets out a gun and shoots the lead mummy three times as the other mummy comes in through the back door and all three of them use their magic to kill him.  Afzel appears and says Sutekh shall not claim his life, and kills himself with his own magic. Satisfied with victory, the mummies begin to leave. Once Toulon returns from the woods, he sees what has happened and acts quickly by putting their souls inside his puppets.

The men return, having sensed someone with the knowledge of the secret of life, and try to kill Toulon. Six-Shooter, however, kills one of the mummies by shooting the chandelier chains, causing it to crush the servant. The two henchmen retreat in order to plot the capture of Elsa to lure Toulon into a trap.

Feeling that he had won the battle, André and his puppets go to a train station to leave Paris to Calais, France before things start to get bad, not realizing they had already begun. The servants killed her parents, the guards and capture Elsa, and then send a dream to Toulon that shows Elsa tied up, and a train. Knowing the meaning, he quickly changes trains to Marseille and gets his puppets ready for the showdown. When the train leaves, André looks around, having released his puppets and letting them follow him throughout the train, until finally coming to the last car and finding Elsa tied up like in his dream. The two men appear and ask for the secret of life. André displays the scroll where the secret is written and asks, "How do you know I haven't copied it?" to which the leader states he did not have enough time to do so, but still is doubtful he hadn't. André, noticing he is distracted, attacks the leader while his puppets attack the other. A large struggle breaks out, and the other henchman is killed with the final leader of the three being thrown from the car. Freeing Elsa, the group rides away in the train, beginning their adventure. After telling the story, the puppets wonder what happened to the other puppets. Andre tells them that's another story, which he will tell them in the future.

Cast
 Guy Rolfe as Elder André Toulon
 Greg Sestero as Young André Toulon
Sestero's 2013 book The Disaster Artist, while primarily focusing on his most famous film The Room, includes two chapters on his casting in and filming of Retro Puppet Master.
 Brigitta Dau as Elsa
 Stephen Blackehart as First Servant
 Jack Donner as Afzel
 Robert Radoveanu as Second Servant
 Vitalie Bantas as Third Servant
 Sandu Teodor as Latour
 George Calin as Valentin
 Juliano Doman as Vigo
 Vlad Dulea as Duval
 Dan Fintescu as Beggar
 Serban Celea as Father
 Elvira Deatcu as Margarette
 Claudiu Trandafir as Leader
 Marcello Cobzariu as First Tough
 Viorel Manole as Second Tough
 Mihai Verbinschi as First Pursuer
 Adrian Ciobanu as Second Pursuer
 Răzvan Popa as Assistant
 Aurelian Popa as Official
 Cristian Irimia as Conductor
 Ion Bechet as Ticket Agent

Featured puppets
 Blade
 Pinhead
 Leech Woman
 Jester
 Tunneler
 Six Shooter

Retro Puppets
 Retro Blade
 Retro Pinhead
 Drill Sergeant (Retro Tunneler)
 Retro Six-Shooter
 Doctor Death
 Cyclops

Release
Retro Puppet Master was released on Blu-ray on May 16, 2017.

References

External links
 
 

Puppet films
Direct-to-video prequel films
American supernatural horror films
Films set in 1902
Films set in 1944
Films set in Switzerland
Films set in Egypt
Films set in Paris
Films shot in Romania
American action horror films
1999 horror films
Films directed by David DeCoteau
Puppet Master (film series)
1999 films
The Kushner-Locke Company films
1990s English-language films
1990s American films
American prequel films